Ferrazzano is a town and comune in the province of Campobasso, in the Italian region Molise.

The town is a medieval village sited on a hilltop in the central part of Italy, in the mountains about halfway across the "knee" of the Italian peninsula. The village is composed of fieldstone row houses with clay tile roofs. Its small piazza is anchored by a simple fountain. The village also has a small  castle with a stone turret, and a Catholic church of The Assumption.  

During Roman era, the region was populated by the Samnites who contributed, together with others in the area, who fought the Roman invaders in the first Samnite wars. When they realized that the Roman leader Sulla was on the verge of victory (he who had already destroyed the nearby towns of Morcone and Bojano around a century before Christ), they gathered old men, women, children and herds and migrated eastwards (Lucera) abandoning the huts, the poor shelters and the harsh land. The Roman leader Sulla set up a garrison at the top of the hill, around which houses were subsequently built and the first nucleus of the town that today called Ferrazzano was built.  

The town is mentioned for the first time in the year 953 with the name of "loco Firaciani"; Nothing remarkable has happened over many centuries; the town passed from one hand to another according to historical events of marriages and hereditary transfers. In the 12th century Ferrazzano was ruled by Riccardo Camarda, from 1269 by the family of Giniaco and later by the house of Sangro; later it became a fief of De Sus.

Transportation
The nearest railway station is that of Campobasso.

People
American actor Robert De Niro's great-grandparents, Giovanni Di Niro and Angelina Mercurio, immigrated to the United States from Ferrazzano in 1887.

References